Tapul, officially the Municipality of Tapul (Tausūg: Kawman sin Tapul), is a 5th class municipality in the province of Sulu, Philippines. According to the 2015 census, it has a population of 18,197 people.

Geography

Barangays
Tapul is politically subdivided into 15 barangays. 
 Alu-Kabingaan
 Banting
 Hawan
 Kalang (Poblacion)
 Kamaunggi
 Kanaway
 Kanmangon
 Kaumpang
 Pagatpat
 Pangdan
 Puok
 Sayli
 Sumambat
 Tangkapaan
 Tulakan

Climate

Demographics

Economy

References

External links
Tapul Profile at PhilAtlas.com
[ Philippine Standard Geographic Code]
  Tapul Profile at the DTI Cities and Municipalities Competitive Index
Philippine Census Information
Local Governance Performance Management System

Municipalities of Sulu
Island municipalities in the Philippines